Hebrew Wikipedia is the Hebrew language edition of Wikipedia.

History

Timeline 
8 July 2003: The Hebrew edition of Wikipedia was launched.
 25 October 2003: The 1,000th article was written.
 22 July 2004: The first meeting of Hebrew Wikipedians took place in Tel Aviv, Israel.
 10 September 2004: The 10,000th article was written.
 20 September 2004: The Hebrew version of the Flag of Kazakhstan article became the one millionth article created in all Wikipedias.
 24 December 2006: The 50,000th article was written.
 10 January 2010: The 100,000th article was written.
 29 August 2013: The 150,000th article was written.
 28 December 2016: The 200,000th article was written.
15 September 2019: The 250,000th article was written.
 3 August 2021: The 300,000th article was written.
 
Hebrew Wikipedia features several organized article writing projects, among them Wikitort - an academic project to write original articles about tort law, PhysiWiki - a project to write and improve articles about Physics with the cooperation of Weizmann Institute of Science, and ongoing academic projects. Another major topic is Jewish history and the History of Israel. In 2006, the Elef Millim project was launched to provide Wikipedia with free images. Groups of Wikipedians meet for field trips around the country to take pictures of Israeli sites. 
 
Hebrew spelling is a matter of debate. Since the standards published by the Academy of the Hebrew Language are not always meticulously followed in common usage,  the Hebrew Wikipedia community decides on problematic cases of spelling through discussion and polls to ensure  consistency. When technically possible, spelling decisions are periodically enforced using automatic replacement by a bot.

Hebrew Wikipedia's requirements for notability standards are relatively strict.

Hebrew Wikipedia organizes yearly competitions, sometimes with the assistance of the Wikimedia foundation, as well as social gatherings and picnics.

2010 Knesset meeting

On the occasion of the 100,000 articles milestone, the Science and Technology Committee of the Knesset (Israeli parliament) invited Wikipedia contributors and users to the 2 February 2010 morning meeting, to join in a debate about Wikipedia and other open-source resources. Some Wikipedia contributors at the meeting criticized "the lack of government cooperation with their efforts to compile a free online Hebrew-language encyclopedia," as well as sharing complaints from Wikipedia editors abroad that since the Israel Defense Forces does not release photos for free redistribution on the Internet, the sole source of available pictures for entries such as the Gaza War and the 2006 Lebanon War are the Palestinians.

Comparison with other language editions
In July 2006, Hebrew Wikipedia had one of the highest number of bytes per article, and the highest of all editions on Wikipedia with over 20,000 articles.

Whereas the English Wikipedia requires a general consensus for deleting articles (hence deletion discussion is not considered to be a voting process), the Hebrew Wikipedia has adopted a policy of deletion upon a 55% majority, with no minimum number of votes. In these votes, only registered users with one month seniority and at least 100 edits in the article, file, category or template namespaces in the past 90 days can vote.

As of December 2020, with more than 30,000,000 edits and 3,200 active users, Hebrew Wikipedia had an abnormally high number of edits and active users (in comparison with its 284,400 articles on various topics at the time and the number of Hebrew speakers in the world), in comparison with other Wikipedias with similar number of articles. The number of active users grows in a steady pace year to year. The average number of articles per day is also significantly higher.

Strict inclusion criteria
Compared to English Wikipedia, Hebrew Wikipedia is more conservative with respect to content in multiple ways. 

The inclusion criteria are detailed under the "principles and guidelines" page. Some examples:
 Articles on porn movies will be deleted unless they became cultural symbols.
 Articles on porn stars will be deleted unless they have other notable aspects in their lives.
 A book has to meet one of these three criteria: sold 10,000 copies, won a prize, or has notable cultural/public value evidenced by a notable review.
 Writers have to write at least two books to be notable as writers.
 Singers and bands should have an album to their credit.
 Articles on student films are deleted unless they won first prize in a film festival or were screened in mainstream cinemas.

List articles are rare. In particular, lists of TV series episodes are not accepted, even as part of the articles on the series.

Other controversial topics are articles of about small schools and minor educational institutions.

Hamichlol

Hamichlol ( "The Entirety") is a mirror of the Hebrew Wikipedia. It contains articles copied from the Hebrew Wikipedia which are edited to be acceptable to Orthodox Jewish readers.

Statistics

See also
Wikimedia Israel

References

External links

  Hebrew Wikipedia

Hebrew-language encyclopedias
Wikipedias by language
Internet properties established in 2001
Hebrew-language websites